Methodrone is the debut studio album by American psychedelic rock band The Brian Jonestown Massacre, released in 1995 by record label Bomp!.

Content 

The title of the album is a portmanteau of the drug methadone, used in treatment of heroin addiction, and the word "drone". The album's dreamy shoegaze rock sound is comparable to that of Spacemen 3 and My Bloody Valentine.

Methodrone is the only album to feature vocalists Elise Dye and Paola Simmonds. Drummers Brian Glaze and Graham Bonnar were also brought into the line-up to replace Ricky Maymi who had begun playing bass in the band. It was also Graham Bonnar's only appearance in the band.

Cover artwork 

The faces featured on the cover artwork are, clockwise from top left, Brian Glaze, Matt Hollywood, Anton Newcombe and Dean Taylor. The water ripple effect resembles the artwork of Pink Floyd's 1971 record Meddle.

Release 

"She Made Me" and "Evergreen" were previously released as a double A-side single in 1992.

Methodrone was released in 1995 by record label Bomp!. The album was released following the departure of guitarist and founding member Travis Threlkel.

The album was re-released in 2007 on Anton Newcombe's A Records.

"Wisdom" was later re-recorded on the band's first and only album with TVT Records, Strung Out in Heaven. "Wisdom", "She's Gone", "That Girl Suicide" and "Evergreen" were included on the band's greatest hits compilation Tepid Peppermint Wonderland: A Retrospective.

Critical reception 

Methodrone was largely ignored upon its release, but managed to garner a favorable review in CMJ New Music Monthly, with Brian Bannin writing: "Everything moves with the slowness and presence of a disgraced monarch in exile... At its best, Methodrone has the tormented grace of accepting doom".

In 2018, Pitchfork ranked Methodrone at number 33 on its list of "The 50 Best Shoegaze Albums of All Time".

Track listing

Personnel
The Brian Jonestown Massacre
Anton Newcombe – guitar, bass, drums, vocals
Jeffrey Davies – guitar
Rick Maymi – bass
Matt Hollywood – bass, vocals
Brian Glaze – drums
Graham Bonnar – drums
Elise Dye – vocals
Paola Simmonds – vocals

Engineering and mixing
Anton Newcombe
David Deresinski
Eric Holland
John Karr
Jessica Wing
Adriene Gulyassy

References

External links 

 

1995 debut albums
The Brian Jonestown Massacre albums